National Highway 120 is a national highway of India. This highway runs entirely in the state of Bihar.

Route 
Bihar Sharif, Nalanda, Rajgir, Hisua, Gaya, Daudnagar, Nasriganj, Karakat, Dawath, Nawanagar, Dumraon.

References

National highways in India
National Highways in Bihar